The 2020 Virginia Tech Hokies men's soccer team represented Virginia Tech during the 2020–21 NCAA Division I men's soccer season. It was the 49th season of the University fielding a program.  The Hokies played their home games at Sandra D. Thompson Field in Blacksburg, Virginia.  The Hokies were led by twelfth-year head coach Mike Brizendine.

The teams' 2020 season was significantly impacted by the COVID-19 pandemic, which curtailed the fall season and caused the NCAA Tournament to be played in Spring 2021. The ACC was one of the only two conferences in men's soccer to play in the fall of 2020.  The ACC also held a mini-season during the spring of 2021.

The Hokies finished the fall season 3–2–2 and 3–1–2 in ACC play to finish in second place in the North Division.  In the ACC Tournament they lost to Clemson in the Quarterfinals.  They finished the spring season 4–4–2 and 2–4–0 in ACC play, to finish in fifth place in the Coastal Division.  They received an at-large bid to the NCAA Tournament.  They defeated Oregon State in the Second Round before losing to the number six seed Seton Hall in the Third Round to end their season.

Previous season 

The 2019 Virginia Tech men's soccer team finished the season with a 10–6–3 overall record and a 2–4–2 ACC record.  The Hokies were seeded eleventh–overall in the 2019 ACC Men's Soccer Tournament.  The Hokies won their first round match up against Louisville, but fell to Wake Forest in the quarterfinals.  The Hokies earned an at-large bid into the 2019 NCAA Division I Men's Soccer Tournament.  As the tenth overall seed Virginia Tech defeated New Hampshire in the second round, before losing to Stanford in the third round.

Preseason

Player movement

Players leaving

Players arriving

Transfers

Preseason rankings

ACC Media Poll 
The ACC men's soccer media poll was released on September 8, 2020. Virginia Tech was picked to finish third in the ACC North Division.

Preseason honors and awards 

 All-ACC Preseason Team
 Kristo Strickler, Senior, Forward

Squad

Roster 
Updated: December 10, 2020

Team management

Schedule 

Source:

|-
!colspan=7 style=""| Fall Regular season

|-
!colspan=7 style=""| ACC Tournament
|-

|-
!colspan=7 style=""| Spring Exhibition

|-
!colspan=7 style=""| Spring Regular season

|-
!colspan=7 style=""| NCAA Tournament
|-

Honors and awards

Rankings

Fall 2020

Spring 2021

2021 MLS SuperDraft 

Source:

References

External links 
 Virginia Tech Men's Soccer

2020
Virginia Tech Hokies
Virginia Tech Hokies
Virginia Tech Hokies men's soccer
Virginia Tech